Crack-Up is a 1946 film noir directed by Irving Reis, remembered for directing many "Falcon" movies of the early 1940s including The Falcon Takes Over. The drama is based on "Madman's Holiday", a short story written by mystery writer Fredric Brown.  The drama features Pat O'Brien, Claire Trevor, Herbert Marshall, and others.

Plot
Art critic and forgery expert George Steele (O'Brien) is stopped by a policeman as he breaks into the Manhattan Museum. He claims that he was in a train wreck. Police Lieutenant Cochrane (Wallace Ford), however, finds no recent wreck. Steele, unsure himself what happened, relates the bizarre events leading up to the present. A flashback ensues:

Museum director Barton (Erskine Sanford) reprimands staff member Steele over the sensational style of his public lectures and is annoyed that he wants to demonstrate a forgery detection method by X-raying a masterpiece that was recently exhibited, Dürer's Adoration of the Kings. Afterward, while having a drink with girlfriend and magazine writer Terry Cordell (Claire Trevor), Steele receives an urgent telephone call informing him that his mother has been taken to a hospital. He rushes to Grand Central Station and catches the last train. About 40 minutes later, Steele watches helplessly as another train crashes head on with his.

Cochrane reveals that Steele's mother was never taken to the hospital. Anxious to avoid a scandal, Barton pleads with Cochrane not to arrest the man. Stevenson, the curator and Steele's friend, and Dr. Lowell (Ray Collins), a member of the museum's board of directors, vouch for Steele's character. In private, Traybin (Herbert Marshall), an art expert with Scotland Yard investigating the suspicious loss of a Gainsborough painting, tells Cochrane he wants Steele freed, with detectives discreetly following him, as he is uncertain if Steele is involved. Steele is released, but is fired by Barton at the direction of the museum board because of his alleged mental instability.

Steele sets out to re-enact the train ride, hoping to find out what is going on. He learns that a drunk was taken off at the next station by two men and believes the supposed drunk was actually himself. He informs Stevenson of his discovery. Steele begins to suspect that the Gainsborough supposedly lost in a fire at sea was actually a fake. Later, Stevenson calls Steele to tell him he has discovered that the fire was not an accident and to meet him in the museum vault that night. When Steele arrives, however, he finds Stevenson dead. Seen standing over the body by an employee, he flees. Although both Traybin and Terry plead with him to turn himself in, Steele is determined to exonerate himself.

He coerces Barton to meet him and confirms that the Gainsborough "lost" was indeed a forgery and was destroyed to conceal the existence and theft of the original. Steele follows Barton to a party given by a museum board member, where he learns by eavesdropping from the fire escape that the shipment of the Dürer painting to London has been unexpectedly advanced. Steele sneaks aboard the ship, where he finds a fire burning in the bonded cargo hold. He removes the painting from its frame to save it, only to discover he has been locked in. The ship's crew arrives to put out the fire, followed by Traybin and Cochcrane, who spots Steele. Steele escapes with the painting from the ship by shinnying down the hawser mooring the ship to the dock, where Terry picks him up in her car.
  
Terry persuades Mary, Barton's secretary, to arrange for Steele to X-ray the painting, which he confirms is a copy. However, as  Terry,  Mary, and he are leaving, he is knocked out and Mary pulls a gun on Terry. Terry and the punchy Steele are taken to the estate of Dr. Lowell, who is behind the thefts and forgeries. He explains to Terry that as a frustrated art lover, he could never have acquired such fabulous works legitimately. Before killing them as the only witnesses to his scheme, Lowell uses narcosynthesis on Steele to assure himself that Steele did not tell the police, the technique he also used to make Steele believe he was in a train wreck. Lowell waits for a passing scheduled train to mask the sound of gunshots, but Traybin and Cochrane intervene, shooting Lowell just before he can kill Steele. Traybin had been waiting outside the entire time, waiting to determine where the stolen art is concealed. To save herself from being charged as an accessory to Stevenson's murder, Mary shows them the location.

Cast

 Pat O'Brien as George Steele
 Claire Trevor as Terry Cordell
 Herbert Marshall as Traybin
 Ray Collins as Dr. Lowell
 Wallace Ford as Lt. Cochrane

 Dean Harens as Reynolds
 Damian O'Flynn as Stevenson
 Erskine Sanford as Barton
 Mary Ware as Mary

Critical reception
Bosley Crowther, film critic for The New York Times, panned the film, especially the screenplay and direction of the drama. He wrote, "Since Pat O'Brien's noggin suffers a blow which blacks out his memory as the story starts, there probably wouldn't be much sense taking the authors to task for the fantastic events which ensue ... This explosive and promising action sets in motion a chain of circumstances which, no doubt, must have baffled the script writers, too, for they never do give it a logical explanation ... All of the aforementioned principals turn in competent performances, and the mystery is how they managed to get through the picture without becoming hopelessly confused. They certainly were one up on us there. Played at breakneck pace, Crack-Up might have succeeded in covering up its confusion through sheer physical action, but Irving Reis elected to direct in waltz tempo. This gives one time to think about the curious motivation, and when you start thinking about a picture such as Crack-Up you are overwhelmed by its inadequacies."

Time Out Film Guide called the film a "[m]arginally intriguing [film] for its view of art (pro-populist, anti-élitist stuff like surrealism), it's made as a thriller by the excellent supporting cast and fine, noir-ish camerawork from Robert de Grasse.

Critic Dennis Schwartz wrote, "The film takes a populist stand by promoting 'art for the masses' and takes a negative view of the art elitists (art critics and collectors) who favor such art styles as surrealism. That kind of art is considered subversive by George and is not as tame as is the classical style of Gainsborough. The art lesson didn't register, but as a thriller Crack-Up was right on track. The shadowy photography by Robert de Grasse was done in stylish chiaroscuro shadings, giving the film an uncanny feel. O'Brien was convincing as the pig-headed unconscious American who has modern technology work for him and against him, as the inventions from the war are now shared by both criminals and scientists."

References

External links
 
 
 
 
 Crack-Up essay by Robert Weston at Film Monthly
 

1946 films
1940s mystery thriller films
1940s psychological thriller films
American mystery thriller films
American black-and-white films
1940s English-language films
Film noir
Films based on short fiction
Films directed by Irving Reis
RKO Pictures films
Films scored by Leigh Harline
1940s American films